Vittorio Fabris (born 22 March 1993) is an Italian footballer who plays as a midfielder for A.C. Mestre.

Career
Fabris started his career at Vicenza Calcio. He was a player of under-17 team in 2009–10 season, as well as for the reserve team from 2010 to 2012.

In July 2012 he was signed by Parma. He was farmed to FeralpiSalò in temporary deal on 21 August 2012. In June 2013 FeralpiSalò signed Fabris in co-ownership deal for €60,000. Im 2014 FeralpiSalò signed Fabris outright on a two-year contract.

In the summer of 2016 he moved to Venezia which played in the Lega Pro at the time.

On 30 August 2018, he signed a one-year contract with Serie C club Monopoli.

On 31 March 2020 he joined Südtirol until the end of the season.

On 2 March 2021 he signed with Fermana. He left the club at the end of the season. In December 2021, he moved to A.C. Mestre.

References

External links
 
 AIC profile (data by football.it) 

1993 births
People from Valdobbiadene
Sportspeople from the Province of Treviso
Living people
Italian footballers
Association football midfielders
L.R. Vicenza players
FeralpiSalò players
Calcio Padova players
S.S. Monopoli 1966 players
F.C. Südtirol players
Fermana F.C. players
Serie C players
Footballers from Veneto